Pool B of the 2023 Rugby World Cup will begin on 9 September 2023. The pool includes holders South Africa, and fellow automatic qualifiers Ireland and Scotland. They are joined by Romania and Tonga.

Teams

Notes

Standings

Matches

Ireland vs Romania

South Africa vs Scotland

Ireland vs Tonga

South Africa vs Romania

South Africa vs Ireland

Notes:
This is the first ever meeting between these two sides at a World Cup.

Scotland vs Tonga

Scotland vs Romania

South Africa vs Tonga

Ireland vs Scotland

Tonga vs Romania

Notes:
This is the first ever meeting between these two sides at a World Cup.

References

Pool B